Azerbaijan participated at the 2018 Summer Youth Olympics in Buenos Aires, Argentina from 6 October to 18 October 2018.

Medalists

Medals awarded to participants of mixed-NOC (combined) teams are represented in italics. These medals are not counted towards the individual NOC medal tally.

Competitors

Athletics

Boxing

Gymnastics

Artistic
Azerbaijan qualified one gymnast based on its performance at the 2018 European Junior Championship.

 Boys' artistic individual all-around - 1 quota

Rhythmic
Azerbaijan qualified one rhythmic gymnast based on its performance at the European qualification event.

 Girls' rhythmic individual all-around - 1 quota

Judo

Individual

Team

Taekwondo

Table tennis

Azerbaijan qualified one table tennis players based on its performance at the European Continental Qualifier and the “Road to Buenos Aires” qualification tournament.

Singles

Team

Weightlifting

Azerbaijan qualified one athlete based on its performance at the 2017 World Youth Championships.

Boy

Girl

Wrestling

Key:
  – Victory by Fall
  – Without any points scored by the opponent
  – With point(s) scored by the opponent
  – Without any points scored by the opponent
  – With point(s) scored by the opponent

References

2018 in Azerbaijani sport
Nations at the 2018 Summer Youth Olympics
Azerbaijan at the Youth Olympics